Pseudathrips buettikeri is a moth in the family Gelechiidae. It was described by Povolný in 1986. It is found in Saudi Arabia.

References

Gelechiinae
Moths described in 1986